The Missing Girl is a 2015 American drama film directed by A.D. Calvo. It was shown in the Vanguard section of the 2015 Toronto International Film Festival.

Synopsis
The film follows Mort, a comic book store owner that hires Ellen, a graphic novel artist trying to get her big break in the world of professional comics.

Cast
 Robert Longstreet as Mort Colvins
 Alexia Rasmussen as Ellen Peter
 Eric Ladin as Skippy
 Thomas Jay Ryan as Stan Colvins
 Shirley Knight as Mrs. Colvins
 Kevin Corrigan as Curly
 Sonja Sohn as Franny
 Adam David Thompson as J. Lee
 Alesandra Assante as Madeline
 Ralph Rodriguez as Gumby

Reception
We Got This Covered gave the film four stars, with the consensus "Robert Longstreet delivers an excellent performance and helps carry The Missing Girl to a place where it's a pleasantly enjoyable character study." Brian Tallerico of RogerEbert.com compared the film favorably to the 2001 film Ghost World and stated that it was "awkwardly stylized (sometimes too much), but the leads are always engaging, and the plot is unique and entertaining."

References

External links
 
 
 

2015 films
2015 drama films
American drama films
Films shot in Connecticut
Films directed by A. D. Calvo
2010s English-language films
2010s American films